In mathematics, specifically in the study of topology and open covers of a topological space X, a star refinement is a particular kind of refinement of an open cover of X.

The general definition makes sense for arbitrary coverings and does not require a topology.

Given a point  we write  instead of  Note that 

Star refinements are used in the definition of fully normal space and in one definition of uniform space. It is also useful for stating a characterization of paracompactness.

See also

References

 J. Dugundji, Topology, Allyn and Bacon Inc., 1966.
 Lynn Arthur Steen and J. Arthur Seebach, Jr.; 1970; Counterexamples in Topology; 2nd (1995) Dover edition ; page 165.

Topology
Families of sets